Mariko  may refer to:

Places
 Mariko-juku (鞠子宿), a post station along the Tōkaidō
 Mariko, Mali
 Mariko (crater), an impact crater on Venus

People
 MC Mariko (Mari Pajalahti, born 1979), Finnish music group Kwan
 Bourama Mariko (born 1979), a Malian judoka
 Oumar Mariko (born 1959), a Malian doctor and politician
 Mariko (given name)